Keepsake may refer to:

Souvenir, a (small) item that reminds a person of a specific event or time
Keepsake (video game), an adventure game
Keepsake (quartet), a barbershop quartet
Keepsake (band), an influential emo band
The Keepsake, a literary annual
Giftbook, another name for a giftbook or annual
"Keepsake", a track from The Gaslight Anthem's 2012 album, Handwritten
Keepsakes (album), a 2006 album by All About Eve
Keepsake, a 2010 album by Kathy and Carol
Keepsake (Heavy Heart album), 2017
Keepsake (Hatchie album), 2019